Heinrich Georg Schomburgk (23 June 1885 – 26 March 1965) was a male tennis player and footballer from Germany.

At the Stockholm Olympics in 1912 he won a gold medal in the mixed doubles event with Dorothea Köring.

He participated in the 1906 Wimbledon Championships, reaching the second round, where he was beaten by Frank Riseley, who later on was to challenge the defending champion Laurence Doherty

References

1885 births
1965 deaths
Sportspeople from Leipzig
German male tennis players
Olympic tennis players of Germany
Olympic gold medalists for Germany
Tennis players at the 1912 Summer Olympics
Tennis players at the 1908 Summer Olympics
Olympic medalists in tennis
Medalists at the 1912 Summer Olympics